Jack Wesley Janssen (July 6, 1923–March 7, 2013) was an American politician who served as a Democrat in the Kansas State Senate from 1965 to 1980.

Janssen was born and resided in Lyons, Kansas. He was elected to the Kansas State Senate in 1964 and served for four terms: first in the 33rd District, followed by one term in the 23rd District, and two final terms in the 35th District.

References

Democratic Party Kansas state senators
20th-century American politicians
People from Lyons, Kansas
1923 births
2013 deaths